The 2022 Baden Masters was held from August 19 to 21 at the Curling Club Baden Regio in Baden, Switzerland as part of the World Curling Tour. The event was held in a round-robin format with a purse of 35,000 CHF. It is the first men's event of the 2022–23 World Curling Tour. The event category for the event was 500.

Teams
The teams are listed as follows:

Round-robin standings 
Final round-robin standings

Round-robin results
All draw times listed in Central European Time.

Draw 1
Friday, August 19, 8:00 am

Draw 2
Friday, August 19, 10:30 am

Draw 3
Friday, August 19, 1:00 pm

Draw 4
Friday, August 19, 4:00 pm

Draw 5
Friday, August 19, 6:30 pm

Draw 6
Friday, August 19, 9:00 pm

Draw 7
Saturday, August 20, 8:00 am

Draw 8
Saturday, August 20, 10:30 am

Draw 9
Saturday, August 20, 1:45 pm

Draw 10
Saturday, August 20, 4:15 pm

Playoffs

Source:

Quarterfinals
Saturday, August 20, 8:30 pm

Semifinals
Sunday, August 21, 9:00 am

Final
Sunday, August 21, 1:30 pm

References

External links
Official Website
CurlingZone

Baden Masters
2022 in curling
2022 in Swiss sport
August 2022 sports events in Switzerland
21st century in Baden-Württemberg
Baden, Switzerland